In English and Irish law, a fee farm grant is a hybrid type of land ownership typical in cities and towns. The word fee is derived from fief or fiefdom, meaning a feudal landholding, and a fee farm grant is similar to a fee simple in the sense that it gives the grantee the right to hold a freehold estate, the only difference being the payment of an annual rent ("farm" being an archaic word for rent) and covenants, thus putting both parties in a landlord-tenant relationship.

Types

Fee farm grants fall into three categories:
 Feudal fee farm grants
The ban on subinfeudation in the fee simple did not apply to land granted after Quia Emptores to supporters of the Crown. These new estates (many of which were created after the 17th-century plantations) were thus regularly divided into subtenures as fee farm grants.
 Conversion fee farm grants
Any perpetually renewable leases for life were converted into fee farm grants after the enactment of the Renewable Leasehold Conversion Act 1849. This act also allowed any existing lessees for lives to convert their holding into a fee farm grant.
 Express fee farm grants
The Landlord and Tenant Law Amendment (Ireland) Act 1860 (i.e. Deasy's Act) allowed for the creation of express fee farm grants.

Reform
In Ireland the Land and Conveyancing Law Reform Act 2009 (Section 12) does not allow the creation of any new fee farm grants, and where any such attempt is made a fee simple is automatically created instead. The act did not alter the status of any existing fee farm grants.

Etymology
 Fee – A right in law to the use of land; i.e. a fief.
 Farm –  a fixed yearly amount of rent or other payment (from the Medieval Latin ferma, firma).
 Grant – transfer of property by deed of conveyance.

See also
 Allodial title
 Demesne
 Fee tail
 Fee simple
 Ground rent
 Leasehold
 Life estate
 Quia Emptores

Notes

External links
 Land and Conveyancing Law Reform Act 2009 [PDF]
 Law Reform Commission (2003)Report on Land Law and Conveyancing Law [PDF]

Property law of Ireland
English property law
Feudalism in the British Isles